Bloodas is a collaborative mixtape by American rappers Lil Durk and Tee Grizzley. It was released on December 8, 2017, by 300 Entertainment, Def Jam Recordings and Only the Family. The production on the mixtape was handled by Chopsquad DJ, Jamz, Fuse, and ATL Jacob, among others. The mixtape was supported by one single: "What Yo City Like".

Singles
The album's lead single, "What Yo City Like", was released for digital download on December 2, 2017.

Critical reception

Andrew Sacher of BrooklynVegan praised the artists' styles, stating: "Their styles are noticeably different but they complement each other surprisingly well, and they work perfectly with the album's sharp production", concluding with "If these guys aren't already on your radar, Bloodas is proof that you should change that, stat." Scott Glaysher of HipHopDX wrote about the mixtape's thematic direction: "There isn't an overarching concept they're reaching for within these dozen cuts — it's simply a collection of quick and dirty gangster jams aimed to please their core audiences", concluding with "Simply put, the joint project doesn't have enough shining moments to warrant a follow-up." Evan Rytlewski of Pitchfork wrote that "Bloodas is the work of two elites who admire each other's craft, but mostly who just get a kick out of each other’s company."

Track listing
Credits adapted from BMI and ASCAP.

Charts

References

Lil Durk albums
2017 mixtape albums
Tee Grizzley albums
Collaborative albums
Def Jam Recordings albums